Asoiva Karpani (born 18 June 1996) is an Australian rugby union footballer who plays for the NSW Waratahs in the Super W. She is an Australian Wallaroos representative, she previously played for the St George Illawarra Dragons in the NRL Women's Premiership.

Background
Karpani is the sister of Newcastle Knights NRLW player Simone Karpani.

Playing career

Rugby union
Born in Queensland and raised in Adelaide, South Australia, Karpani played for Onkaparinga and Brighton before representing the Australian Youth rugby sevens team at the 2013 Australian Youth Olympic Festival.

In 2017, she played for the University of Adelaide at the Aon University Sevens. In 2018, she moved to Sydney and joined the NSW Waratahs Super W team for 2019 season.

On July 13 2019, she made her Test debut for the Australia against Japan.

Karpani was named in Australia's squad for the 2022 Pacific Four Series in New Zealand. She was named in the Wallaroos squad for a two-test series against the Black Ferns at the Laurie O'Reilly Cup. She was selected in the team again for the delayed 2022 Rugby World Cup in New Zealand.

Rugby league
On 31 July 2018, Karpani signed with the St George Illawarra Dragons NRL Women's Premiership team. Prior to signing with the Dragons, she represented South Australia and the Combined Affiliated States.

In Round 1 of the 2018 NRL Women's season, she made her debut for the Dragons in their 4–30 loss to the Brisbane Broncos.

In 2019, she played for the South Sydney Rabbitohs in the NSWRL Women's Premiership.

References

External links
Wallaroos profile

1996 births
Living people
Australian sportspeople of Tongan descent
Australian female rugby league players
Australian female rugby union players
Australia women's international rugby union players
Rugby league props
St. George Illawarra Dragons (NRLW) players
Christies Beach Football Club players